Lubomír Vosátko (born January 26, 1977) is a Czech professional ice hockey defenceman currently playing for HK Nitra. He played with HC Vítkovice in the Czech Extraliga during the 2010–11 Czech Extraliga season. He is currently playing for Polish team TH Unia Oświęcim.

Career statistics

References

External links 
 
 

1977 births
AZ Havířov players
Czech ice hockey defencemen
Hokej Šumperk 2003 players
HC Olomouc players
HC Slezan Opava players
HC Oceláři Třinec players
HC Vítkovice players
HC ZUBR Přerov players
HK Nitra players
HKM Zvolen players
LHK Jestřábi Prostějov players
Living people
Orli Znojmo players
PSG Berani Zlín players
TH Unia Oświęcim players
Ice hockey people from Prague
Czech expatriate ice hockey players in Slovakia
Czech expatriate sportspeople in Poland
Expatriate ice hockey players in Poland